The 2001 German Formula Three Championship was a multi-event motor racing championship for single-seat open wheel formula racing cars that held across Europe. The championship featured drivers competing in two-litre Formula Three racing cars built by Dallara which conform to the technical regulations, or formula, for the championship. It commenced on 21 April at Hockenheim and ended at the same place on 6 October after ten double-header rounds.

Opel Team BSR driver Toshihiro Kaneishi became the first and only Japanese champion and the first champion from Asia. He clinched the title, winning races at Norisring and A1-Ring. Stefan Mücke finished as runner-up with wins at Nürburgring and Hockenheim, losing just four points to Kaneishi. Frank Diefenbacher and Pierre Kaffer both won four races to end the season third and fourth in the drivers' standings. Markus Winkelhock won Rookie title and three races. The other race winners was Gary Paffett, João Paulo de Oliveira, Kosuke Matsuura and Björn Wirdheim.

Teams and drivers
All drivers competed in Dallara chassis and used Yokohama tyres; model listed.

Calendar
With the exception of round at A1-Ring in Austria, all rounds took place on German soil.

Results

Championship standings

Championship

† — Drivers did not finish the race, but were classified as they completed over 90% of the race distance.

Junior-Pokal (Rookie) standings

References

External links
 

German Formula Three Championship seasons
Formula Three season
German
German Formula 3